The 1901 Drexel Dragons football team represented the Drexel Institute—now known as Drexel University–as an independent during the 1901 college football season.  The team did not have a head coach.

Schedule

References

Drexel
Drexel Dragons football seasons
Drexel Dragons football